Lilium parryi, common name lemon lily, is a rare species of lily.

Lilium parryi is native to the southwestern United States and northwestern Mexico where it grows in moist areas in mountain habitats. In California it is currently known from the San Bernardino and San Gabriel Mountains and a few remaining spots near Palomar Mountain to the south. It is the only true lily native to  Arizona, where a few populations can be found in the Huachuca, Chiricahua, and Santa Rita Mountains. In Mexico, it has been found in mountains in the states of Sonora and Baja California.

The inflorescence is a raceme bearing up to 31 large, showy, bright lemon yellow flowers. The flowers are pollinated by hawkmoths, especially Hyles lineata and Sphinx perelegans.

Threats to this species include grazing, recreation, natural flooding and human alterations in water regimes, and horticultural collecting of the bulbs and flowers.

Lilium parryi was named for Charles Christopher Parry (28 August 1823 – 20 February 1890), a British-American  botanist and mountaineer.

Idyllwild, California, hosts the Lemon Lily Festival, which celebrates this species.

References

External links
Calflora Database: Lilium parryi (lemon lily)
Jepson Manual Treatment of Lilium parryi
USDA Plants Profile for Lilium parryi (lemon lily)
UC Photos gallery: Lilium parryi

parryi
Flora of Arizona
Flora of California
Flora of Baja California
Flora of Sonora
Natural history of the Peninsular Ranges
Natural history of the Transverse Ranges
Flora without expected TNC conservation status